ABT-724 is a drug which acts as a dopamine agonist, and is selective for the D4 subtype. It was developed as a possible drug for the treatment of erectile dysfunction, although poor oral bioavailability means alternative drugs such as ABT-670 may be more likely to be developed commercially. Nonetheless, it continues to be used in scientific research into the function of the D4 receptor.

See also 
 ABT-670
 Bremelanotide
 Cabergoline
 Flibanserin
 Intrinsa
 Melanotan II
 Pramipexole
 PF-219,061
 Tibolone
 UK-414,495

References 

Dopamine agonists
Piperazines
2-Pyridyl compounds
Benzimidazoles